"Now the Chips Are Down" is a 1978 British television documentary episode about the importance and influence of microprocessors within the UK economy. Aired by the BBC as part of its Horizon series, it was  produced by BBC Television and narrated by British radio and television presenter Paul Vaughan.

The documentary is a report on the "applications and implications" of microprocessors to employment within the British economy. Science historian Robert M. Young wrote in 1981 that the programme played an "important part" in raising awareness about microprocessors within government and the general public.

Consequences 
Britain's lagging place in the worldwide technology race was widely acknowledged after the documentary was screened. This included nationwide discounts on computers to schools and colleges, and was followed by government backing of the BBC's Computer Literacy Project. Funding for related education schemes continued until 1988.

References

External links 
 "Now the Chips Are Down" at DocuWiki.net
 Now the Chips Are Down on the BBC iPlayer. This link contains the whole programme and also a studio discussion, but non-UK IP addresses are geo-blocked and cannot watch it.
 
 "Now the Chips Are Down" at Archive.org

1978 British television episodes
BBC television documentaries
History of computing in the United Kingdom
Horizon (British TV series)